The 2nd Army Division is a unit of the Peruvian Army.

History
The unit was first created along with the creation of the Central Military Region, being then activated in 1962.

In 1975, what started as a police strike soon became a riot across the entirety of Lima, in what would later be known as the Limazo. After members of the Civil Guard barricaded themselves in their Radio Patrulla barracks, the 2nd Division was ordered to remove them by force, which was done on the same day.

Its coat of arms features the division's motto in quechua, as well as a condor and an emblem featuring Incan weapons.

Organization
The 2nd Army Division is formed by the following units:
 1st Special Forces Brigade
 3rd Special Forces Brigade
 18th Armored Brigade
 Rural Settlement Command
 Peruvian Guard Legion
Hussars of Junín
 "Mariscal Domingo Nieto" Cavalry Regiment Escort

See also
1st Army Division
3rd Army Division
4th Army Division
5th Army Division

References

Military units and formations of Peru